This is a list of islands of Switzerland. Switzerland is a landlocked country, hence all Swiss islands are located in lakes or rivers. This list also includes islands in artificial lakes (*). In these cases, the water levels may drop by a few metres at some periods of the year, thereby turning some islands into peninsulas.

See also
 List of lakes of Switzerland
 List of rivers of Switzerland
 List of islands

References
Swisstopo
Google Earth

External links
Inseln in der Schweiz (PDF-Format) - Directory with information for visitors (German language)
Verzeichnis der Inseln List with map and coordinates.

Switzerland
Islands